Pavlov and its feminine form Pavlova are common Russian (Па́влов, Па́влова) and Bulgarian surnames. Their Ukrainian variant is Pavliv. All stem from Christian name Paul (Russian: Pavel; Ukrainian: Pavlo). These names may refer to many people:

In arts and entertainment

Film and television
Sergey A. Pavlov (born 1958), Russian actor, director
Viktor Pavlov (1940–2006), Soviet/Russian actor

Literature
Karolina Pavlova, Russian writer
Nikolai Pavlov, Russian writer
Oleg Pavlov (1970–2018), Russian writer
Vera Pavlova, Russian writer

Music
Alla Pavlova (born 1952), Russian composer
Dmitri Pavlov (composer) (born 1959), Russian composer
Petya Pavlova, Bulgarian singer

Other arts
Anelia Pavlova (born 1956), Bulgarian-born Australian artist
Anna Pavlova (1881–1931), Russian ballet dancer
Anna Pavlova (gymnast) (born 1987), Russian artistic gymnast

Fictional characters
The Contesa Pavlova, fictional character in the film Buenos Aires me mata

In government and politics
Aleksandr Pavlov (politician), Kazakhstani politician, economist, financier and banker
Jo Pavlov, Green Party Candidate, Hamilton, Ontario, Canada
Sergei Pavlov - Soviet politician
Valentin Pavlov, Prime Minister of the Soviet Union
 Vladimir Pavlov (politician, born 1956), Russian politician
 Vladimir Pavlov (politician, born 1976), Russian politician

In military
Dmitry Pavlov (general) (1897–1941), Soviet general
Yakov Pavlov (1917–1981), Soviet platoon commander

In science
Alexei Petrovich Pavlov (1854–1929), Russian geologist and paleontologist
Ivan Pavlov (1849–1936), Nobel Prize–winning Russian physiologist noted for his classical conditioning experiments with dogs
Maria Pavlova (1854–1938), Russian paleontologist
Mikhail Grigoryevich Pavlov (1793–1840), Russian philosopher and scientist
Nina Pavlova (1897–1973), Russian botanist

In sport

Football (soccer)

Alyaksandr Pawlaw (born 1984), Belarusian international footballer
Sergei Aleksandrovich Pavlov (born 1955), Russian football manager
Yevhen Pavlov (born 1991), Ukrainian footballer

Track and field
Igor Pavlov (athlete) (b. 1979), Russian pole vaulter
Pavel Pavlov (athlete) (1952–2004), Bulgarian sprinter
Pepa Pavlova, Bulgarian sprinter

Other sports
Aleksandr Pavlov (wrestler) (born 1973), Belarusian wrestler
Alexander Pavlov (figure skater), Australian figure skater
Anna Pavlova (gymnast) (born 1987), Russian artistic gymnast
Igor Pavlov (ice hockey player) (born 1965), Latvian ice hockey player, ice hockey coach in Germany
Ivan Pavlov (figure skater), Ukrainian figure skater
Mircea Pavlov (born 1937), Romanian chess master
Pavel Pavlov (wrestler) (b. 1953), Bulgarian wrestler
Serhii Pavlov (born 1997), Ukrainian basketball player
Yelena Pavlova, Kazakhstani volleyball player

In other fields
Cyril Pavlov (1919–2017), Russian Orthodox hieromonk and archimandrite, confessor of Russian patriarchs
Igor Pavlov (programmer), Russian freelance programmer, creator of 7-zip
Iliya Pavlov (1960–2003), Bulgarian businessman
Mikhail Pavlov (disambiguation)
Nikolay Pavlov (disambiguation)

See also
Pavlov (disambiguation)
Muriel Pavlow, British actress

Russian-language surnames
Bulgarian-language surnames
Patronymic surnames
Surnames from given names